Sarno is a town and comune of Campania, Italy.

Sarno may also refer to:
Sarno (surname), Italian surname
Sarno (river), Italy

See also
 Battle of Sarno (disambiguation), two military engagements, in 553 and 1460